Vita Dryden (née Robinson, born 20 December 1982) is a female rugby union player for  and Auckland. She was a member of the 2010 Women's Rugby World Cup squad.

References

External links
Black Ferns Profile

1982 births
Living people
New Zealand women's international rugby union players
New Zealand female rugby union players
Female rugby union players